Bento Matheus Krepski (born 10 June 1999), simply known as Bento, is a Brazilian footballer who plays for Athletico Paranaense as a goalkeeper.

Club career
Born in Curitiba, Paraná, Bento joined Athletico Paranaense' youth setup in 2013, at the age of 14. Promoted to the first team for the 2020 season, he was initially a fifth-choice behind Santos, Jandrei, Anderson and Caio, and renewed his contract until 2023 in July of that year.

On 25 November 2020, as both Santos and Jandrei tested positive for COVID-19, Bento made his first team debut by starting in a 1–1 Copa Libertadores home draw against River Plate. He made his Série A debut three days later, starting in a 3–0 away loss against Palmeiras.

On 30 March 2021, Bento renewed his contract with Furacão until December 2024. He further extended his link until 2025 on 26 October, and became a first-choice in the 2022 season, after Santos left for Flamengo.

Career statistics

Honours
Athletico Paranaense
Campeonato Paranaense: 2020
Copa Sudamericana: 2021

References

External links
Athletico Paranaense profile 

1999 births
Living people
Footballers from Curitiba
Brazilian footballers
Association football goalkeepers
Campeonato Brasileiro Série A players
Club Athletico Paranaense players